Pileni is a culturally important island in the Reef Islands, in the northern part of the Solomon Islands province of Temotu.  Despite its location in Melanesia, the population of the islands is Polynesian.

It is vulnerable to tsunamis and the sea level rising.

History
The first church in Pileni was set up in the 1930s. The island was hit by cyclones in the 1950s, 1985 and 1993, and a tsunami struck the island in 1990. An extension school was set up on the island in 2002, the classroom of which is the island's only permanent building. From 2000, there has been a reported shortage of fish and shellfish, and some fruit trees have died.

Economy
Per household, the average monthly income is between SI$51 and SI$200. Some households sell pigs to increase their income.

Language
Pileni once gave its name to the Samoic-Outlier language spoken there. What used to be called Pileni is now more commonly referred to under its native name Vaeakau-Taumako.

References

External links
 POLLInet
 https://web.archive.org/web/20080120074303/http://solomonislands.com.sb/pileni.html

Islands of the Solomon Islands
Polynesian outliers